The Plaxton Premiere, Plaxton Excalibur and Plaxton Prima were closely related designs of coach bodywork built by Plaxton.

The Premiere and Excalibur were introduced in 1991 as replacements for the Paramount. The Premiere was the mainstream design, available in the same two heights as its predecessor (but expressed in centimetres, 320 and 350, rather than millimetres). The Excalibur was a premium specification coach, based on the Premiere 350 but with a more dramatically styled front end.

A taller export version of the Excalibur, built on Volvo B12 chassis, was briefly marketed by Volvo in France, and was named Prestige (a name which was subsequently re-used by Plaxton on the home market for a low-floor bus).

The Excalibur accounted for around 15% of production; the Premiere 350 was the most popular model taking about 45%; and the 3.2-metre Premiere 320 and Prima made up the remaining 40%.

Chassis
The Volvo B10M was by far the most popular chassis on which the range was built, accounting for nearly three quarters of the total (including over 90% of Excaliburs). The Dennis Javelin chassis accounted for about 15% of output, with the remainder consisting of DAF SB3000, Volvo B7R, Volvo B12 and Scania K93 or K113.

Most of the Scanias were the low 320 model, and an early order from Shearings for thirty K93s accounted for a majority of them.

Over 97% of the bodies built were on 12m chassis.

Styling

The Premiere and the Excalibur share much of the same body structure, apart from the upper front end. They are flat-sided designs, with a high, straight window line. The cab window and door glazing sweep down, in a shape reminiscent of the Paramount III's pentagonal feature window, to meet the lower edge of the windscreen.

The Premiere has an upright front end; the Excalibur's is more raked back, and a thicker pillar separates the door or cab from the adjacent window. An air-intake grille was incorporated into the bumper on early Volvo B10Ms, whereas a plain panel was used on other chassis types. Later B10Ms had an even simpler, single-barred opening, or a plain panel. Updates to the front end during 1993 were minor; subtle changes to the headlight area replaced the vertical inner edges with angled ones, and the removable front panel section was reduced in width.

The original design has two thin grooves running along the vehicle sides, level with the top and bottom of the headlights. This persisted after the 1993 update, but plain skirt panels were used on later built vehicles. Both designs of skirt panel curve neatly under at the bottom.

On early built vehicles, the high-mounted rear window curved up into the roof, with a horizontally grooved panel below it. Horizontal rear light clusters were fitted low down. The rear end underwent a major redesign in 1993 following complaints about leaks. The revised design had a flat rear window, separated from the roofline, and vertical rear light clusters mounted at the body corners.

Variants
 The Expressliner II was a variant of the Premiere 350 built to National Express specification on Volvo B10M chassis. The Expressliner name had previously been used on Paramount bodies built to a similar specification.
 The Interurban (or Premiere Interurban) was a variant of the Premiere 320 designed for medium distance interurban services. It was supplied to the Stagecoach group.

Replacement
The Premiere 350 and Excalibur were superseded by the Paragon and Panther respectively. The Prima, introduced as a variant of the low-height Premiere 320, was facelifted, with styling cues from the Paragon, to become the Plaxton Profile, which continued production until 2012.

Body numbering
Since the 1989 build season, Plaxton's body numbering system has used a letter to identify the body style. The following letters are used for the Premiere, Excalibur and Prima:

M   Premiere 320 and Prima
P   Premiere 350
S   Excalibur
T   Prestige (high floor export coach)

Premiere